North Fambridge is a village and civil parish on the Dengie peninsula in the English county of Essex.

North Fambridge is on the north bank of the River Crouch opposite South Fambridge and is served by North Fambridge railway station on the Crouch Valley Line. Administratively, North Fambridge forms part of the ward of Purleigh in the district of Maldon.

Adjoining the village is Blue House Farm, a  Site of Special Scientific Interest and nature reserve owned by the Essex Wildlife Trust.

In the Domesday Book, North Fambridge was known as 'Fanbruge'.

North Fambridge is home to the Fambridge Yacht Haven Middle Distance Triathlon. The first event took place on 24 July 2011 and was the first Half Ironman Triathlon in Essex and the wider region.

Local amenities
The local public house is The Ferry Boat Inn. The North Fambridge Yacht Club is based in the village.

Holy Trinity Church has been serving the community for at least 200 years.

References

External links

Local History overview
War Memorial details
Local history of North Fambridge

Villages in Essex